Holothuria hilla is a species of sea cucumber in the subgenus Mertensiothuria of the genus Holothuria. Some common names include the contractile sea cucumber, the sand sifting sea cucumber and the tigertail sea cucumber, and in Hawaii it is known as the light spotted sea cucumber. It is found in the Indo-Pacific region and the Red Sea.

Description
Holothuria hilla is a cylindrical sea cucumber, tapering slightly at the posterior end. The integument is thin, soft and wrinkled. The dorsal surface is covered with longitudinal rows of tube feet modified into thorn-like conical papillae with broad bases, sometimes joined in pairs. These are creamy-white, in contrast to the pinkish, golden or brown background colour of the skin. The ventral surface is similar in colour but the papillae are ranged in four or five rows and are longer and yellowish. The mouth is on the underside and is surrounded by a ring of twenty, yellowish peltate tentacles. This species has Cuvierian tubules but does not expel them defensively as do some other species.

Distribution and habitat
This species is found in the Red Sea, Persian Gulf and the tropical west and central Indo-Pacific oceans, as far east as Hawaii, and even Panama.

Ecology
Holothuria hilla is a detritivore, raking sand into its mouth with its oral tentacles, extracting and digesting the bacteria, animal and vegetal particles, and voiding the sand through its anus. In this way it churns up significant areas of the seabed.

Reproduction is either sexual, when the male and female liberate their gametes into the water column, or asexual, by fission. Sexual reproduction mostly occurs at hotter times of year and asexual reproduction when it is cooler. In Réunion, where the species is rare, fission is the only breeding method that has been observed. The animal stops feeding and conceals itself while splitting; the missing parts regenerate and are often paler in colour than the original parts.

References

Holothuriidae
Fauna of the Indian Ocean
Fauna of the Pacific Ocean
Animals described in 1830
Taxa named by René Lesson